Murasaki (群咲) is a Japanese pop punk band formed in 2020 in Japan. The band released their first single "Not Me" on August 12, 2020, and the first album Ashitakoso on January 31, 2022.

Members 

 Chisa Kimura (木村千咲, Kimura Chisa) Vocals, lyrics
 RamSeeni (ラムシーニ, RamSeeni) Keyboard, composition, arrangement

Discography 
Singles

 Not Me (2020)
 Floating in the deep sea (2020)
 Invisible girl goes in the sky (2020)
 Mozōseikatsu (2023)

Albums

 Tomorrow (2022)

Others

 NPC (2021)

Filmography 
Radio

 Murasaki no kosan burunara imana node wa!? (群咲の古参ぶるなら今なのでは!?) 2021/10/3-present, MC
 Vinyl Music ~Kayōkyoku 2.0~ (ヴァイナル・ミュージック～歌謡曲2.0～) 2022/01/22, MC
 Vinyl Music ~Kayōkyoku 2.0~ (ヴァイナル・ミュージック～歌謡曲2.0～)  2022/02/09, MC
 Non ko to Nobita no animesukuranburu (ノン子とのび太のアニメスクランブル) 2022/04/13, Guest

Web shows

 DAM CHANNEL (DAMチャンネル) 2022/02, Guest

References

External links 
 Official website (in Japanese)
  (in Japanese)
 

Japanese pop punk groups
Musical groups established in 2020
2020 establishments in Japan